10th New York Film Critics Circle Awards
(announced December 27, 1944)

Going My Way
The 10th New York Film Critics Circle Awards, announced on 27 December 1944, honored the best filmmaking of 1944.

Winners
Best Film:
Going My Way
Best Actor:
Barry Fitzgerald - Going My Way
Best Actress:
Tallulah Bankhead - Lifeboat
Best Director:
Leo McCarey - Going My Way

References

External links
1944 Awards

1944
New York Film Critics Circle Awards, 1944
1944 in American cinema
1944 in New York City